The 2007 World Sprint Speed Skating Championships were held in Vikingskipet, Hamar, on 20–21 January 2007. They were the 36th World Championships, and it was the third time the Championships were held in Hamar. Several of the world's top skaters, including the top two from the 2006 men's and women's standings, did not take part in the competition, while Lee Kang-seok (men), Lee Sang-hwa and Wang Beixing (women), all among the top three in the 500 meter World Cup rankings, did not take part as they are competing in other colliding tournaments.

Three-time world allround champion Anni Friesinger entered for the second time, after winning silver in 2004, and won gold by more than one samalog point, the greatest margin of victory since Monique Garbrecht-Enfeldt's last title in 2003. She thus became the fourth woman to become world champion in both allround and sprint.

Conversely, the men's competition was the closest since Bae Ki-tae won South Korea's first title, in 1990. The men's title went to a Korean for the third time in the tournament's history. Finland's Pekka Koskela led the tournament until two laps remained of the 1000 metres, but despite skating a better last lap than Lee he finished 0.065 points behind the Korean.

Men championships

Results 

DQ = disqualifiedNS = Not Started

Women championships

Results 

DQ = disqualifiedNS = Not Started

Rules 
All participating skaters are allowed to skate the two 500 meters and two 1000 meters.

External links
 Tournament homepage
 ISU website

References
 Results of the 2007 World Championship Sprint Men, from SpeedSkatingStats.com
 Results of the 2007 World Championship Sprint Women, from SpeedSkatingStats.com
  Fakta: Sprint-VM skøyter, from hamar-dagblad.no

2007 World Sprint
World Sprint Speed Skating Championships, 2007
World Sprint, 2007
Sport in Hamar
2007 in Norwegian sport